Joanna is an extinct town in Ralls County, in the U.S. state of Missouri. The GNIS classifies it as a populated place. 

A variant name was "Oakland". A post office called Joanna was established in 1895, and remained in operation until 1912. The community was named after Joanna Burnett, the mother of a local merchant.

References

Ghost towns in Missouri
Former populated places in Ralls County, Missouri